Decrees were legislative acts of the highest Soviet institutions, primarily of the Council of People's Commissars (the highest executive body) and of VTsIK (the highest legislative body between sessions of the Congress of Soviets), issued between 1917 and 1924. Such acts issued after 1924 are referred to as Decisions or Ukases in Soviet sources.

Bolshevik Initial Decrees

The Bolshevik Initial Decrees (the 'Decrees') were announced as soon as the Bolsheviks declared their success in the October Revolution (October 26, 1917). The Decrees seemed to conform to the popular Bolshevik slogan "Peace, Land and Bread", taken up by the masses during the July Days (July 1917), an uprising of workers and military forces. The slogan succinctly articulated the grievances of the Russian peasantry, armed forces and proletariat (the working-class sections of Russian society). As revisionist historian Christopher Read suggests, "The Bolsheviks were successful in uniting the diverse revolutionary movements and directing them towards one goal", namely the establishment of state-socialism.  At the same time, the Bolsheviks were not "re-inventing the wheel." Legal reforms along similar lines to the Decrees had been discussed in the State Duma but were not implemented due to internal disagreements.

The Decree on Peace outlined measures for Russia's withdrawal from the First World War without "payment of indemnities or annexations". This decree aimed to secure the support of many soldiers on the disintegrating Russian front. The sincerity of this Bolshevik assurance came under scrutiny when V.I. Lenin endorsed the Treaty of Brest-Litovsk which divested Russia of its Baltic territory.

The Decree on Land outlined measures by which the peasants were to divide up rural land among themselves. It advocated the forceful dissolution of many wealthy estates by peasant forces. Such measures no doubt contributed to an increase in Bolshevik support amongst the peasantry, but were counterproductive in that the Russian war front disintegrated as soldiers (who were formerly peasants) returned to secure land for themselves.

The Workers' Decrees outlined measures for minimum wage, limitations on workers' hours, and the running of factories by elected workers' committees. This consolidated Bolshevik support amongst the working classes in the cities, where they had taken power.

The Bolsheviks also declared approximately 100 other decrees outlining the formal setup of Bolshevik government through the medium of the soviet institutions. Nevertheless, Soviet political sovereignty was to be further challenged by the fact that the Social Revolutionary party attained over 50% of the votes in a democratically elected Assembly in January 1918. The Assembly was promptly shut down by the Bolsheviks on the grounds that the Soviets (workers' councils) were a more advanced democratic representation of the Russian people.

The significance of the Decrees has been the subject of historical debate. There is consensus that the Bolsheviks wanted to secure popular support through them. However, historians question the Bolsheviks' motives in pursuing this populist agenda. Liberal historians are sceptical and see the Decrees as opportunistic. For instance, Edward Acton believes that the Bolsheviks realised that the mass of ordinary people did not share their objectives. Furthermore, those ordinary people had no idea that their interests were not tied to the Bolsheviks. The reality was that "the cleavage of the goals of the masses and that of the Bolsheviks was fundamental." Richard Pipes takes this analysis further and contends that key Bolsheviks intentionally proposed the Decrees to gain the legitimacy they would need to bring about a totalitarian state. Revisionist historians take a different view. According to them, the advent of a totalitarian state was circumstantial. The Bolsheviks were not opportunists but benevolent idealists; the point of the Decrees was to bring about a better quality of life for the Russian people. Regardless of which view is the more accurate account, it is clear from these opposing perspectives that the history of the Initial Decrees is a politically charged issue. This is perhaps because historians use the Decrees to try to discern whether the implementation of Marxist thought has totalitarian tendencies.

List of Soviet Decrees

1917

1918

1919

1920

1921

1922

1924

References

External links
Decrees of the Soviet government 1917-1926 (in Russian)
Decrees of the Soviet government 1917-1918 (in Russian)

Soviet law